Banachy  (Banakhy) is a village in the administrative district of Gmina Harasiuki, within Nisko County, Subcarpathian Voivodeship, in south-eastern Poland.

The village has a population of 210.

References

Banachy